Little Sackville River is a river in Halifax Regional Municipality, Nova Scotia, Canada.

In 2002, many fish in the Little Sackville River were killed by an aluminum compound.

See also
List of rivers of Nova Scotia

References

External links
Sackville Rivers Association

Rivers of Nova Scotia
Landforms of Halifax, Nova Scotia
Landforms of Halifax County, Nova Scotia